Power Trip may refer to:

 An act of power harassment, bullying or abuse of rights by someone with authority, power and/or advantageous social status, purely for their own egotistic gratification
 The Power Trip, a professional wrestling tag team consisting of Triple H and Stone Cold Steve Austin
Power Trip: A Decade of Policy, Plots and Spin, a book by Damian McBride
"Power Trip / To Heck and Back", an episode of Rocko's Modern Life
Power Trip (film), a 2003 documentary by Paul Devlin
Power Trip: Theatrically Berkeley, 2009 documentary film about Berkeley, California
"Power Trip" (song), a 2013 song by J. Cole
"Power Trip", a song by Chimaira from the album The Impossibility of Reason
"Power Trip", a song by Soundgarden from the album Louder Than Love
Power Trip (band), an American thrash metal band
Power Trip, a 2022 scripted podcast starring Tatiana Maslany

See also
Powertrip